The Tass River is a river of the West Coast Region of New Zealand's South Island. It flows predominantly northeast from its origins in the Southern Alps east of Lake Hochstetter, reaching the Upper Grey River close to the southern tip of the Victoria Forest Park.

See also
List of rivers of New Zealand

References

Rivers of the West Coast, New Zealand
Rivers of New Zealand